The Dickson Experimental Sound Film is a film made by William Dickson in late 1894 or early 1895. It is the first known film with live-recorded sound and appears to be the first motion picture made for the Kinetophone, the proto-sound-film system developed by Dickson and Thomas Edison. (The Kinetophone, consisting of a Kinetoscope accompanied by a cylinder-playing phonograph, was not a true sound-film system, for there was no attempt to synchronize picture and sound throughout playback.) The film was produced at the "Black Maria", Edison's New Jersey film studio. There is no evidence that it was ever exhibited in its original format.

In 2003, The Dickson Experimental Sound Film was included in the annual selection of 25 motion pictures added to the National Film Registry of the Library of Congress. being deemed "culturally, historically, or aesthetically significant" and recommended for preservation.

Synopsis 
The film features Dickson playing a violin into a recording horn for an off-camera wax cylinder. The melody is from a barcarolle, "Song of the Cabin Boy", from Les Cloches de Corneville (literally The Bells of Corneville; presented in English-speaking countries as The Chimes of Normandy), a light opera composed by Robert Planquette in 1877. In front of Dickson, two men dance to the music. In the final seconds, a fourth man briefly crosses from left to right behind the horn. The running time of the restored film is seventeen seconds; the accompanying cylinder contains approximately two minutes of sound, including twenty-three seconds of violin music, encompassing the film's soundtrack.

Rediscovery

A soundless 35mm nitrate print of the movie, described as precisely forty feet long, was acquired by the Museum of Modern Art and transferred to safety film in 1942. Thomas A. Edison, Incorporated donated the Edison Laboratory to the U.S. National Park Service in 1956.  The soundtrack was inventoried at the Edison National Historic Site in the early 1960s when a wax cylinder in a metal canister labeled "Dickson—Violin by W.K.L. Dixon with Kineto" was found in the music room of the Edison laboratory. In 1964, researchers opened the canister only to find that the cylinder was broken in two; that year, as well, all nitrate film materials remaining at the facility were removed to the Library of Congress for conservation. Among the filmstrips was a print that the Library of Congress catalogued as Dickson Violin. According to Patrick Loughney, the library's film and TV curator, this print is "thirty-nine feet and fourteen frames [two frames short of 40 feet]."

The connection between film and cylinder was not made until 1998 when Loughney and Edison NHS sound recordings curator Jerry Fabris arranged for the cylinder to be repaired and its contents recovered at the Rodgers and Hammerstein Archive of Recorded Sound in New York. A new reel-to-reel master was created, allowing for fidelity reproduction onto digital audio tape. As the library was not equipped to synchronize the recovered soundtrack with the film element, producer and restoration specialist Rick Schmidlin suggested that award-winning film editor Walter Murch be enlisted on the project (the two had worked together on the 1998 restoration of Orson Welles's Touch of Evil). Murch was given the short piece of film and the two minutes of sound recovered from the cylinder to work with. By digitally converting the film and editing the media together, Murch synchronized the visual and audio elements. Industrial Light & Magic also had an unspecified role in the film's restoration. This version was projected on a 20' screen at the Edison National Historic Site on June 1, 2002 as part of the Black Maria Film Festival.

On the cylinder, before the camera starts rolling, a man's voice can be heard to say, "I asked if its working. Is it working already? Go ahead." This extra sound is included on the version of the film that was distributed in the early 2000s. However, since filming had not yet begun when the words were uttered, this cannot be claimed as the first incidence of the spoken word on film.

One question that remains unanswered is how the eventual running time of just over 17 seconds was arrived at. Per the curatorial reports, the 35-mm prints have a standard 16 frames per foot of film— plus 14 frames thus equals a total of 638 frames. Murch describes the film as having been shot at 40 frames per second (fps); Loughney describes it as 46 fps. At 40 fps, 638 frames would run 15.95 seconds, which should be the maximum length of the restored film if all other reports are correct; as Loughney notes, at 46 fps, the film would last 13.86 seconds. If the latter figure is correct, as many as 9 seconds of film are missing from both extant prints if the entire violin performance was filmed. On the basis of his own tests of eighteen Kinetoscope films, scholar Gordon Hendricks argued that no Kinetoscope films were shot at 46 fps, making the speed of 40 fps reported by Murch more likely. Yet there is still a difference of more than a second between the maximum potential running time at that speed and the actual duration of the film as digitized by Murch. That 17-second running time works out to an average camera speed of approximately 37.5 fps, a significant difference from Murch's report.

Interpretations
In his book The Celluloid Closet (1981), film historian Vito Russo discusses the film, claiming, without attribution, that it was titled The Gay Brothers. Russo's unsupported naming of the film has been adopted widely online and in at least three books, and his unsubstantiated assertions that the film's content is homosexual are frequently echoed. In addition to there being no evidence for the title Russo gives the film, in fact, the word "gay" was not generally used as a synonym for "homosexual" at the time the film was made. There is also no evidence that Dickson intended to present the men—presumably employees of the Edison studio—as a romantic couple. Given the lyrics of the song Dickson plays, which describes life at sea without women, it is more plausible that he intended a joke about the virtually all-male environment of the Black Maria. Also, in some areas of life it was acceptable in the 19th century for men to dance with men without homosexual overtones being perceived; all-male "stag dances," for instance, were a standard part of life in the 19th century U.S. Army and were even part of the curriculum at West Point.<ref>See John C. Waugh, The Class of 1846: From West Point to Appomattox—Stonewall Jackson, George McClellan and Their Brothers" (Ballantine Books: 1994), pp. 19, 131, 138.</ref> Still, this may be seen as one of the earliest examples of same-sex imagery in the cinema. An excerpt of the film is included in the documentary based on Russo's book, also titled The Celluloid Closet (1995).

See also
Treasures from American Film Archives

Notes

Sources

Published
Dixon, Wheeler Winston (2003). Straight: Constructions of Heterosexuality in the Cinema (Albany: State University of New York Press, 2003). 
Hendricks, Gordon (1966). The Kinetoscope: America's First Commercially Successful Motion Picture Exhibitor. New York: Theodore Gaus' Sons. Reprinted in Hendricks, Gordon (1972). Origins of the American Film. New York: Arno Press/New York Times. 
Loughney, Patrick (2001). “Domitor Witnesses the First Complete Public Presentation of The Dickson Experimental Sound Film in the Twentieth Century,” in The Sounds of Early Cinema, ed. Richard Abel and Rick Altman (Bloomington: Indiana University Press), 215–219. 
Russo, Vito (1987). The Celluloid Closet: Homosexuality in the Movies, rev. ed. (New York: Harper & Row). 

Online
Dickson Sound Film short, scholarly discussion; part of the UNLV Short Film Archive
"The Three Fathers of Cinema & The Edison/Dickson Experiment" interview with restoration editor Walter Murch by William Kallay, September 27, 2004; part of the 'from Script to DVD' website

External links
The Dickson Experimental Sound Film DesigningSound.org web article published May 7, 2014 about the 2002 restoration of the sound film, with photographs of the brown wax cylinder soundtrack artifact; written by Cormac Donnelly with contributions from Ken Weissman, supervisor of the film preservation lab at the Library of Congress, Jerry Fabris, museum curator at the Thomas Edison National Historical Park and Paul Spehr, author and film historian
The Dickson Experimental Sound Film brief discussion by Walter Murch, with variously formatted clips of the film (note the credits table gives the title of Planquette's opera incorrectly as Les Cloches de Normandie and misdates it 1878); part of the FilmSound.org website
The Dickson Experimental Sound Film anonymously written discussion of film's recovery, with downloadable versions of the film; part of the Internet Archive
The Dickson Experimental Sound Film soundless version on the Library of Congress's YouTube channel
The Dickson Experimental Sound Film restored sound version on the YouTube
The Dickson Experimental Sound Film (1894) movie credits and additional details; part of the Internet Movie Database
"The Pre-History of Sound Cinema, Part 1: Thomas Edison and W.K.L. Dickson" extensive discussion by Spencer Sundell, April 10, 2006; part of the Mugu Brainpan weblogDickson Experimental Sound Film'' essay by Daniel Eagan in America's Film Legacy: The Authoritative Guide to the Landmark Movies in the National Film Registry, A&C Black, 2010 , pages 3–4 

1894 films
1895 films
1890s American films
American LGBT-related short films
American black-and-white films
Film and video technology
Film sound production
American silent short films
Edison Manufacturing Company films
United States National Film Registry films
Films shot in New Jersey
Films directed by William Kennedy Dickson
American dance films
1890s dance films
Early sound films
1894 short films
1895 short films
Articles containing video clips